Meloimorpha is a genus of cricket in the subfamily Cachoplistinae and tribe Homoeogryllini.  The recorded distribution is: India, China, Korea, Japan and Vietnam (but probably other countries in Indo-China).

Species
The Orthoptera Species File lists:
Meloimorpha albicornis Walker, 1869 - India, Vietnam
Meloimorpha cincticornis Walker, 1870 - type species, locality "Indian subcontinent"
Meloimorpha indica Agarwal & Sinha, 1988
Meloimorpha japonica Haan, 1842 - India, Indo-china, China, Korea, Japan

References

External links
 
 

Ensifera genera
Crickets
Orthoptera of Asia